Henri-Alphonse Deckherr (1842-1933) was a French Division General. Early in his career, he fought in the Franco-Prussian War.

Career
Having studied at the École spéciale militaire de Saint-Cyr in 1860, he reached the rank of second lieutenant on October 1, 1862. He became the lieutenant of the 36th infantry regiment in Algeria in August, 1868. During the Franco-Prussian war (1870-1871) he took part in the battle of battle of Wörth. He was made Captain at the Battle of Sedan, and then taken prisoner along with the rest of the army. He became the Major of the 110th infantry regiment in June 1879 then Battalion Commander in April 1880. In March 1889 he was named lieutenant-colonel of the 58th infantry division, and then in September 1892, the Colonel of the 153rd. He was promoted to Division General in 1901. He continued to serve until his retirement in 1907. He was presented with the Legion of Honour that same year in recognition of his service.

Ranks
19/07/1892: Colonel
01/09/1897: Brigade Commander
30/12/1901: Division General

References 
 Cote S.H.A.T.: 9 Yd 332
 Dossier de Légion d'honneur du général Deckherr.

1842 births
1933 deaths
French military personnel of the Franco-Prussian War
French generals